Andreas Stadler may refer to:
 Andreas Stadler (weightlifter)
 Andreas Stadler (political scientist)